Balon's ruffe (Gymnocephalus baloni), also known as the Danube ruffe, is a species of freshwater ray-finned fish, a ruffe, from the family Percidae which is native to the drainages of the Danube from delta to Germany and the Dnieper from delta to Kyiv and is expected to occur in the Dniester.  It inhabits areas with sand or mud substrates.  It is active at night and feeds on small invertebrates.  This species can reach a length of  SL.  It is named after Polish-Canadian ichthyologist Eugene K. Balon (1930-2013).

References

Gymnocephalus
Freshwater fish of Europe
Fish of Europe
Fish described in 1974
Taxonomy articles created by Polbot